Meterana stipata is a moth of the family Noctuidae. It was described by Francis Walker in 1865 from specimens collected in Auckland. It is endemic to New Zealand.

References

External links

 Meterana stipata in species id
 Citizen science observations

Moths described in 1865
Moths of New Zealand
Hadeninae
Endemic fauna of New Zealand
Taxa named by Francis Walker (entomologist)
Endemic moths of New Zealand